Steve Omischl (born November 16, 1978) is a Canadian freestyle skier.

Career
Omischl was born in North Bay, Ontario. Omischl competes in aerials, and made his World Cup debut in December 1999, finishing with a silver medal at an event in Blackcomb. Omischl earned five more podiums on the World Cup circuit before winning his first event in mid-2002.

Along with a fellow olympian Jeff Bean, he participated in an episode of the hit show Mantracker where he defeated Terry Grant in the nerve-wracking chase.

Over his career thus far, Omischl has placed on the podium at 40 World Cup events, and claimed 20 titles. He has won four overall World Cup titles, finishing atop the aerials standings in 2004, 2007, 2008 and 2009. He has won four medals at the World Championships. His lone gold came in 2005, and most recently won a silver medal in 2009.

Omischl has competed in three Olympic Games. In 2002, he placed 4th in the qualifying but ended up 11th in the final. In 2006, he was well positioned to make the final after the first jump, but a poor second jump left him in 20th place.

Omischl was also a member of the Canadian team at the 2010 Winter Olympics in Vancouver. He qualified for the final in 8th and was ranked 8th overall after the final.

World Cup podiums

References

External links
 FIS profile

1978 births
Living people
Olympic freestyle skiers of Canada
Freestyle skiers at the 2002 Winter Olympics
Freestyle skiers at the 2006 Winter Olympics
Freestyle skiers at the 2010 Winter Olympics
Canadian male freestyle skiers
Sportspeople from North Bay, Ontario